Goldman is a Jewish surname. Notable people with the surname include:
Gabriel Goldman (2009–present), American expert in operations research
Alan H. Goldman (born 1945), American philosopher
Alan S. Goldman (born 1958), American chemist
Alain Goldman (born 1961), French film producer
Allan H. Goldman (born 1943), American real estate investor
 Albert Goldman, American professor and author
 Albert Goldman (politician), American Trotskyist lawyer
 Albina A. Goldman, philologist, professor North-Eastern Federal University (Yakutsk State University)
 Allen Goldman (born 1937), American physicist
 Alvin Goldman, philosopher, epistemologist
 Ari L. Goldman, American journalist
 Bernard Goldman (1922–2006), American art historian, married to Norma
 Bo Goldman, American writer, Broadway playwright and screenwriter. 
 Bobby Goldman (1938-1999), American bridge player
 Charles R. Goldman (born 1930), American limnologist and ecologist
 Charley Goldman, boxing trainer 
 Craig Goldman, American politician
 Douglas E. Goldman (born 1952), American businessman and philanthropist
 Duff Goldman, Food Network personality
 Edward Alphonso Goldman, American zoologist
 Edwin Franko Goldman, American band composer, founder of American Bandmasters Association
 Emma Goldman, anarchist writer and speaker
 Francisco Goldman, American novelist
 Irving B. Goldman, plastic surgeon
 James Goldman, American playwright and screenwriter
 Jane Goldman, British writer and television presenter; wife of Jonathan Ross
 Jean-Jacques Goldman, French singer and songwriter
 John D. Goldman (born 1949), American businessman and philanthropist 
 John M. Goldman (1938–2013), British haematologist, oncologist and medical researcher
 Leon Goldman (1906–1997), American surgeon and pioneer in laser medicine
 Leon Goldman (1904-1975), American surgeon
 Lipa Goldman, Orthodox rabbi
 Lloyd Goldman, New York real estate developer 
 Lynn Goldman, American academic
 Marcus Goldman, German-American businessman and entrepreneur, founder of Goldman Sachs
 Marcus J. Goldman, psychiatrist, physician, conservative writer
 Marshall Goldman, economist
 Marvin Goldman (born 1928), American physiologist and radiation biologist
 Marvin G. Goldman (born 1939), American lawyer and aviation historian 
 Mike Goldman, Australian TV personality
 Neil Goldman, television writer (see Neil Goldman and Garrett Donovan)
 Norma Goldman (1922–2011), American classicist, married to Bernard
 Omer Goldman, young political activist
 Oscar Goldman, fictional character
 Oscar Goldman (1925–1986), American mathematician
 Peter Goldman American law consultant 
 Phil Goldman, American engineer and entrepreneur
 Pierre Goldman, French left-wing intellectual
 Rachel Goldman, American physicist
 Rhoda Haas Goldman (1924–1996), American philanthropist
 Richard Goldman (1920–2010), American businessman and philanthropist
 Robert D. Goldman (born 1939), American cell and molecular biologist, author, and President of American Society for Cell Biology, 2008
 Ronald Goldman, victim in the O.J. Simpson murder case
 Sylvan Goldman, American businessman and inventor 
 Sean Goldman, American Author, Screenwriter and Ladies man
 Todd Goldman, American entrepreneur and artist
 Vivien Goldman, journalist, author and musician
 Wendy Z. Goldman, American historian currently the Paul Mellon Distinguished Professor at Carnegie Mellon University.
 William Goldman (1931-2018), American screenwriter and author
 Yoel Goldman (born 1980), American real estate developer
 Yosef Goldman (born 1942), scholar and author

See also 
 Goldman, Missouri, a community in the United States
 Goldman Band, early 20th century band
 Goldman Environmental Prize
 Goldman equation
 Goldman Sachs, leading investment bank, founded by Marcus Goldman
 Goldman School of Dental Medicine, Boston University, USA
 Goldman School of Public Policy, University of California, Berkeley
 Goldmann
List of Family Guy characters#Goldman family, fictional family

Jewish surnames
Yiddish-language surnames